Moritz Willi Florstedt (born 8 October 2001) is a German sprint canoeist.

He competed at the 2021 ICF Canoe Sprint World Championships, winning a bronze medal in the K-1 500 m distance.

References

External links

2001 births
Living people
Sportspeople from Magdeburg
German male canoeists
ICF Canoe Sprint World Championships medalists in kayak